Saint Colman or Kolonat (600   689 AD in Würzburg) was an Irish-born Christian missionary. He was a companion of Kilian and Totnan as missionaries to Franconia. The Saint Colman's day feast is celebrated on October 27.

References

7th-century births
7th-century Irish priests
689 deaths
People of medieval Bavaria
7th-century Christian saints
Medieval Irish saints
Medieval German saints
Colombanian saints
Irish expatriates in Germany